Sokolovići is a village in the municipality of Sokolac, Bosnia and Herzegovina. According to the 1991 census, the village had 80 inhabitants, all of whom were ethnic Serbs.

People
Lala Kara Mustafa Pasha

References

Populated places in Sokolac